Anthony Portier (born 1 June 1982 in Ostend) is a Belgian professional football player who plays for Beerschot Wilrijk. His best position is central in defence.

Portier started playing football at Gold Star Middelkerk, where he was discovered by a neighbouring Belgian coast team, KV Oostende where he eventually made it to the first team. Portier then moved on to Cercle Brugge. He was transferred to the Bruges side a half season after his previous team KV Oostende had relegated from the First division.

Trivia
 Anthony Portier has a Cercle Brugge fan club named after him, De Portiervrienden (English: The Friends of Portier). The fan club is located in Middelkerke, where Portier grew up.

References
 Anthony Portier player info at the official Cercle Brugge site 
 Cerclemuseum.be 

Notes

External links
 

Living people
1982 births
Belgian footballers
Cercle Brugge K.S.V. players
K.V. Oostende players
Royale Union Saint-Gilloise players
Association football defenders
Belgian Pro League players
Challenger Pro League players
Sportspeople from Ostend
Footballers from West Flanders
K Beerschot VA players